Elvira Santa Cruz Ossa (better known as Roxane; Valparaíso, 21 March 1886 – 7 November 1960) was a Chilean dramatist and novelist. She was educated in Santiago at the Convent of the Sacred Hearts. She wrote her first novel, Flor Silvestre, before the age of 20. She also wrote for the magazine, and later became the editor, of Zig-Zag. Her first play was the comedy, La Familia Busquillas (1916), followed in 1919 by El voto femenino. She produced the drama, La Marcha Funebre, in the same year. Her second novel was titled Via Crucis Sentimental.

She was the sister of writer Blanca Santa Cruz Ossa.

Selected works
 Flor silvestre 
 La familia Busquillas: pieza en dos actos 
 El voto femenino 
 La marcha fúnebre 
 Takunga

References

1886 births
1960 deaths
Chilean women dramatists and playwrights
Chilean women novelists
20th-century Chilean novelists
20th-century Chilean dramatists and playwrights
20th-century Chilean women writers